Dr. Aisha Abubakar Abdulwahab (born c.1971) was a Nigeria policewoman who won a UNESCO fellowship award to study tuberculosis.

Life
Aisha Abubakar Abdulwahab was born in c.1971 and she joined the Nigerian police force in 1995. She has a degree in veterinary science and a doctorate.

In 2005 she won a UNESCO fellow award for her proposal to use DNA to identify the link between human and bovine tuberculosis. By taking samples from cows and people she could evaluate the risk that Nigerians made when they drank unpasteurized milk. The award was to enable her to complete the research at any university. Adbulwahab was married with two children.

References

1970s births
Living people
Nigerian police officers
Place of birth missing (living people)
Year of birth uncertain
Nigerian women police officers
Nigerian women medical doctors